Phaeochlaena bicolor is a moth of the family Notodontidae first described by Heinrich Benno Möschler in 1877. It is found in Suriname, French Guiana, Colombia and Ecuador.

See also

References 

Moths described in 1877
Notodontidae of South America